Betty Gabriel (born January 6, 1981) is an American actress. She began her career in musical theater and made her screen debut with the short film In Memoriam (2011). She subsequently played Laney Rucker in the action film The Purge: Election Year (2016) and Denise in the period drama series Good Girls Revolt (2016).

Gabriel had her breakthrough starring as Georgina in the horror film Get Out (2017), which The New York Times cited as one of the best performances of 2017. She earned numerous accolades for the role, including nominations for two Black Reel Awards and a Screen Actors Guild Award. She has since become recognized for her work in Blumhouse films, which include starring as Nari Jemisin in Unfriended: Dark Web (2018), Detective Cortez in Upgrade (2018) and Deeks in Adopt a Highway (2019). She has also portrayed Pam Duffy in the miniseries Defending Jacob (2020) and headlines as Sophie Brewer in the Netflix drama series Clickbait (2021).

Life and career

Early life and early roles 

Gabriel was born January 6, 1981, in Washington D.C. and grew up in Pittsburgh, Pennsylvania and Hyattsville, Maryland. In 2002, Gabriel received a BSc in animal science from Iowa State University. After college, Gabriel relocated to Chicago, studying modern dance and working as an actress in the Chicago theater community. In 2014, she graduated with a Master of Fine Arts in drama from Juilliard.

After doing a bit of theater at Iowa State University, Gabriel got her start working as an actress and dancer in Chicago theater, first as part of her further studies, and then in various productions. Gabriel's first film role was in the 2011 drama In Memoriam. She began her career as a television actress with minor recurring roles in Good Girls Revolt and Westworld before landing her first major film role in the 2016 horror sequel The Purge: Election Year.

The Purge: Election Year, featuring Gabriel's character Laney Rucker, takes place in Washington D.C., twenty years after the first Purge event. Gabriel's character is a notorious former gang member who patrols the streets on Purge Night armed and in an armored "triage van," giving aid to the injured and taking them to makeshift aid stations sponsored by the resistance movement. Gabriel's character allows the consideration to questioning "The American Nightmare," much like in the film Get Out.

2017–present: Get Out and breakthrough with Blumhouse films 

Gabriel was on vacation when she was invited to audition for Get Out. To prepare for the role, Gabriel watched the TED talk of Martin Pistorius to get insight into the feeling of being trapped inside one's own body. She also watched Bride of Frankenstein and talked to her own grandmother, who was raised in Alabama, about racial tensions from her era. The film was a critical and commercial success, and Gabriel earned critical acclaim for her performance. Her role was discussed as a contender for Best Supporting Actress for the 2018 Academy Awards by Variety and The New York Times. The New York Times cited her role as Georgina as one of the best performances of 2017.

Gabriel starred opposite Logan Marshall-Green in the sci-fi action horror film Upgrade (2018), written and directed by Leigh Whannell, and shot on location in Melbourne, Australia. Gabriel has been in six projects by Blumhouse Productions, The Purge: Election Year, 12 Deadly Days, Get Out, Upgrade, Unfriended: Dark Web, and Adopt A Highway. In 2017, Gabriel joined the cast of Westworld as the character Maling. In February 2018, it was announced she would join the second season of Counterpart playing an FBI agent.

In March 2021, Gabriel had a role in the animated horror film The Spine of Night, written and directed by Philip Gelatt and Morgan Galen King. Later in August 2021, she continued her career in the horror genre by playing the role of Sophie Brewer in the Netflix miniseries Clickbait (2021), co-written by Christian White and Tony Ayres, and despite the miniseries receiving a 59% on Rotten Tomatoes, it received 1.46 billion views in one week following its debut.

Gabriel also appeared in the Apple TV+ limited series Manhunt, as well as having a recurring role in the TV series Jack Ryan for its third season  in 2022.

Filmography

Film

Television

Theater 

 2004: Black Nativity by Langston Hughes at Goodman Theatre (Chicago, IL)
 2008: Space by Laura Jacqmin at Side Project Theatre (Chicago, IL)
 2008: Pluto Was a Planet by Laura Jacqmin at Around the Coyote Gallery (Chicago, IL)
 2009: The Comedy of Errors by William Shakespeare at Chase Park Theatre (Chicago, IL)

Awards and nominations

References

External links 

 

21st-century American actresses
African-American actresses
Iowa State University alumni
Juilliard School alumni
People from Washington, D.C.
Actresses from Pittsburgh
People from Hyattsville, Maryland
Living people
1981 births
21st-century African-American women
21st-century African-American people
20th-century African-American people
20th-century African-American women